Larry Clark (born January 19, 1948) is one of the leading directors of the L.A. Rebellion (also known as the Los Angeles School of Black Filmmakers). He directed the feature films Passing Through (1977) and Cutting Horse (2002). He is also a film professor in the Cinema Department at San Francisco State University.

Biography 

A native of Cleveland, Ohio, Clark received a bachelor's degree at Miami University, prior to arriving at UCLA, where he majored in film. While a student at UCLA, Clark taught film workshops at the Performing Arts Society of Los Angeles (PASLA), under the guidance of Vantile Whitfield.

Early career 
Clark was a cinematographer for 1972's Wattstax and his recollections of the making of the film are included on a commentary track of the 2004 special-edition DVD of the restored film. Several crew and cast members are on the track, including Al Bell, president of Stax Records and producer of the film, and director Mel Stuart.

Passing Through served as Clark's master's thesis film at UCLA.  The film stars Nathaniel Taylor (best known as "Rollo" on the hit television series, Sanford and Son) and veteran actor Clarence Muse.  Clark co-wrote the screenplay with actor Ted Lange.  Matthew Duersten of the LA Weekly described the film as a "potent underground L.A. neorealist treatise" that "is raw, gritty, surreal and, at times, terrifying."

Filmography
 Tamu, 1970, 10 min., Director 16mm
 As Above So Below, 1973, Director, 55 min.
 Wattstax, 1974, Co-Cinematographer, feature documentary
 Passing Through, 1977, Director/writer, 104 min., 16mm 
 Cutting Horse, 2001, Director/writer, 124 min., 35mm

Awards and recognition
 Special Jury Prize, Locarno International Film Festival
 Festival International du Film d’Amiens, France
 Cannes International Film Festival  (special event) 
 The Whitney Museum of American Art, New York
 Museum of Modern Art, New York City
 Brooklyn  Academy of Music
 Festival of Pan African Cinema (FESPACO), Ouagadougou, Burkina Faso   
 Moscow Film Festival (information section)
 Deauville Film Festival, France
 San Francisco Museum of Modern Art
 Los Angeles County Art Museum
 Pesaro International Film Festival,  Pesaro Italy
 Festival Internazionale Cinema Giovani, Torino Italy
 The Chicago Film Center
 Auckland Film Festival, New Zealand
 Perth International Film Festival, Australia

References

External links

Cutting Horse official movie site

1948 births
Living people
Film directors from Ohio
English-language film directors
L.A. Rebellion
Miami University alumni
Artists from Cleveland
UCLA Film School alumni
San Francisco State University faculty
20th-century African-American people
21st-century African-American people